NearlyFreeSpeech is a privately funded, US-based, low cost web hosting provider and domain name registrar that began in 2002. It was started in response to concerns about the entry of large companies into Internet publishing, and to promote freedom of speech.

History

Endorsements 
In 2008, Michael Hemmingson of San Diego Reader wrote that the Electronic Frontier Foundation suggested using services such as NearlyFreeSpeech.net and Tor software to avoid being fired for blogging. In 2009 Shawn Powers of Linux Journal reviewed Nearly Free Speech and recommended them over GoDaddy even after having some technical issues. In 2010 Jason Fitzpatrick of LifeHacker.com listed Nearly Free Speech as first of "Five Best Personal Web Hosts" and said they were unusual because of their incremental billing based on usage. In a similar 2012 "top five" list by Alan Henry of LifeHacker.com, Nearly Free Speech was given "honorable mention" and he said they offer exceptional hosting plans for as low as $0.25, and promise to only make you pay for what you use.

In 2010 in "Twitter Application Development For Dummies", Dusty Reagan recommended Nearly Free Speech for learning PHP development. In 2010 Cody Fink of MacStories.net, describing how to install Fever in 10 minutes, called Nearly Free Speech, "an amazing hosting solution that's relatively cheap, especially for light use." In 2012 in "Handbook of Research on Didactic Strategies and Technologies for Education" Nearly Free Speech was cited as a "pay as you go" service, which could reduce costs significantly. In 2013, Nearly Free Speech was used for a low-cost promotion involving the posting of indie Zelda-alike game Anodyne on The Pirate Bay.

Controversies

BugMeNot controversy 
In 2004 Matt Hines of CNET said Nearly Free Speech supported BugMeNot against take-down attempts. Kevin Newcomb of clickz.com wrote that Texas-based NearlyFreeSpeech.net spokesman Jeff Wheelhouse said, "NearlyFreeSpeech.NET supports and defends the free expression rights of www.bugmenot.com and all our members to the very limit of its terms of service."

BugMeNot's move to the Nearly Free Speech provider, which also hosts a number of highly controversial sites, prompted BugMeNot's creator to say, "Personally, I don't care if I'm sharing a server with neo-Nazis. I might not agree with what they have to say, but the whole thing about freedom of speech is that people are free to speak."

Badger Killers website controversy 
In 2012, Kelly Fiveash of The Register said US-based hosting firm Nearly Free Speech resisted UK government attempts to take down the Badger-Killers website, which had personal details of persons deemed to be badger cull supporters, including politicians, farmers and professors.

Alt-right and other controversies 
In 2017, Ali Breland of theHill.com described how NearlyFreeSpeech's commitment was tested in the 2012 badger culling website case. She also quoted the CEO of alt-right Twitter alternative Gab, who said that NearlyFreeSpeech might be a "safe haven" for his website after their web host gave them five days to transfer their domain. In 2017 in Media Law, Ethics, and Policy in the Digital Age, NearlyFreeSpeech's policy of not shutting down site services without a court order made them the hosting choice for Crocels News after other services shutdown their services during a defamation dispute. In 2019 in Technical Blogging: Amplify Your Influence, Antonio Cangiano "wholeheartedly" recommended Nearly Free Speech as registrar and webhost for controversial content.

In January 2021, NearlyFreeSpeech published a statement on their response to a surge in business and communications from "racists." The statement was intended to clarify their positions on "free speech," refusal to host illegal content, careful cooperation with law enforcement, and opposition of racism, hatred and bigotry.

References

External links

Employee-owned companies of the United States
Web hosting
File hosting
Domain name registrars
Cloud platforms
Internet properties established in 2002